A dock is infrastructure used for berthing watercraft.

Dock or DOCK may also refer to:

Transportation
 Dry dock, a construction and repair facility for ships
 Floating dock (disambiguation), several different types of structures
 Loading dock, an area for trucks to deliver or receive cargo
 Pier, a type of maritime structure
 Space dock, a structure used for the docking and berthing of spacecraft

Computing
 Dock (computing), or taskbar, a graphical user interface feature
 Dock (macOS), the taskbar in the macOS operating system
 Docking station, used for connecting laptops or other mobile devices
 DOCK, molecular analysis software

Plants and animals 
Dock, or dockweed, a name for plants in the genus Rumex, especially broad-leaved dock
Dock, more rarely used in the names of certain similar broad-leaved plants, like velvet dock
Tailhead, or dock, the beginning of an animal's tail

Biochemistry 
DOCK, software for use in molecular docking
DOCK (protein), a family of proteins involved in cell signalling

Places
The Dock, Newfoundland and Labrador, Canada
The Dock, Washington, D.C., United States
The Dock Gymnasium, Louisiana State University Shreveport, United States 
Docks (nightclub) in Hamburg, Germany
The Docks Waterfront Entertainment Complex in Toronto, Ontario, Canada
The former name of Devonport, Devon, now a part of the city of Plymouth
Execution Dock in London

Other uses
The area of a courtroom where an accused party sits during proceedings
To pierce dough during its handling to prevent the formation of large air pockets, such as with a roller docker
Dock or Hayden Scott-Baron (born 1980), English manga illustrator
Dock (given name), include a list of people with the name

See also
Docking (disambiguation)
Docker (disambiguation)
Docklands (disambiguation)
Dox (disambiguation)
DOC (disambiguation)
Docs (disambiguation)
Dockx 
Hohe Dock, one of the highest peaks in the Glockner Group of the Austrian Alps